Yasser Mahmoud (born February 23, 1964) is an Egyptian handball player. He competed for Egypt's national team at the 1992 and 1996 Summer Olympics.

References 

1964 births
Living people
Egyptian male handball players
Olympic handball players of Egypt
Handball players at the 1992 Summer Olympics
Handball players at the 1996 Summer Olympics
20th-century Egyptian people